

Early 14th century (1301–1350)

Late 14th century (1351–1400)

Early 15th century (1401–50)

Late 15th century (1451–1500)

Early 16th century (1501–50)

Late 16th century (1551–1600)

External links
Poll – The Most Important Battles in History

List of battles: before 301 – 301–1300 – 1301–1600 – 1601–1800 – 1801–1900 – 1901–2000 – 2001–current

1301
Warfare of the Middle Ages